Kamena Gorica  is a village in Croatia. 

Populated places in Varaždin County